Staudernheim is a municipality in the district of Bad Kreuznach in Rhineland-Palatinate, in western Germany.

References

Bad Kreuznach (district)
Naheland